Overlord is a Japanese anime television series based on the eponymous light novel series written by Kugane Maruyama and illustrated by so-bin. The series was produced by Madhouse under the direction of Naoyuki Itō, script composition by Yukie Sugawara, and music composed by Shūji Katayama. Overlord first aired in Japan on AT-X from July 7 to September 29, 2015 with additional broadcasts by Tokyo MX, Sun TV, KBS Kyoto, TV Aichi, and BS11.

The second season moved to MBS. The second season aired from January 10 to April 4, 2018. The third season aired from July 11 to October 2, 2018.

On May 8, 2021, a fourth season and an anime film were announced, with the film covering the Holy Kingdom Arc of the series. The fourth season aired from July 5 to September 27, 2022. The staff and cast members returned to reprise their roles for the fourth season.

Series overview

Episode list

Season 1 (2015)

Season 2 (2018)

Season 3 (2018)

Season 4 (2022)

OVAs

Notes

References

Overlord